Weissella kimchii is a Gram-positive bacterium from the genus of Weissella which has been isolated from fermented cassava from Ketou in Benin.

References

 

Bacteria described in 2010
Weissella